This article is a list of toys; the toys included are both widely popular (either currently or historically) and provide illustrative examples of specific types of toys.

Action figures

 Army men
 B-Daman
 Digital pet
 Evel Knievel Action Figure
 Funko
 G.I. Joe
 Gumby
 He-Man
 Jumping Jack
 Kenner Star Wars action figures 
 Lara
 Little People
 Monster in My Pocket
 Playmobil
 Power Rangers
 The Smurfs merchandising
 Stretch Armstrong
 Teenage Mutant Ninja Turtles
 Toy soldier
 Transformers
 Weebles

Animals
 Breyer Animal Creations
 Filly
 Ithaca Kitty 
 Littlest Pet Shop 
 My Little Pony 
 National Geographic Animal Jam
 Puppy in My Pocket 
 Rocking horse
 Schleich
 Sock monkey
 Stick Horse
 ZhuZhu Pets

Cars and radio controlled 

 Corgi
 Cozy Coupe
 Dinky 
 Hot Wheels
 Majorette
 Matchbox
 Power Wheels
 Slot cars
 Tomica
 Tonka

Construction toys

Erector Set
K'Nex
Lego
Lincoln Logs
Märklin
Meccano
Megablocks 
Playmobil
Rasti
Rokenbok
Stickle bricks
STIKFAS
Tinkertoy
Tog'l
Zaks
Zome

Creative toys 

Cleversticks
 Colorforms
 Crayola Crayons
 Creepy Crawlers
 Lego
 Lite-Brite
 Magna Doodle
 Magnetic Poetry
 Mr Potato Head
 Play-Doh 
 Rainbow Loom
 Shrinky Dinks
 Silly Putty
 Spirograph
 Stickers

Dolls

African dolls
American Girl 
Amish doll
Anatomically correct doll
Apple doll
Art doll
Baby Alive
Ball-jointed doll
Barbie
Bisque doll
Black doll
Cabbage Patch Kids
Celebrity doll
Chatty Cathy
China doll
Composition doll
Fashion doll
Frozen Charlotte
Groovy Girls
Inuit doll
Japanese traditional dolls
Jumping jack (toy)
Lupita dolls
Mannequin
Matryoshka doll
Paper doll
Parian doll
Peg wooden doll
Polly Pocket
Rag doll
Reborn doll
Shopkins
Strawberry Shortcake
Tanjore doll
Teddy bear
Topsy-Turvy doll
Troll doll
Voodoo doll

Educational toys

 Ant Farm
 Lego Mindstorms
 Lego Mindstorms NXT
 qfix robot kits
 See 'n Say
 Speak & Spell
 LeapFrog Fridge Phonics Magnetic Letter Set

Electronic toys
Digital pet
Entertainment robot
Robot dog
Robot kit
USB toy
Battery Operated Ride on Toys, Kids Cars, Kids Jeeps

Executive toys

Drinking bird
Fidget Spinner
Magic 8-Ball
Newton's cradle
Pin Art

Food-related toys 
 Easy-Bake Oven
 Pez dispenser
 Snow cone machine
 Tea set
 Mini Brands

Games 
 Atari 2600
 Barrel O' Monkeys
 Battleship
 Candy Land
 Chutes and Ladders
 Clue
 Concentration (aka Memory)
 Connect Four
 Dominoes
 Dungeons & Dragons
 Game Boy
 Hungry Hungry Hippos
 Life
 Mad Libs
 Mattel Auto Race
 Monopoly
 Mouse Trap
 Nintendo Entertainment System
 Operation
 PlayStation
 Pong
 Pretty Pretty Princess
 Risk
 Rock 'Em Sock 'Em Robots
 Scrabble
 Simon
 Sorry!
 Toss Across
 Trivial Pursuit
 Twister
 Uno
 Xbox

Physical activity and dexterity

 Kids Cars, Kids Jeeps, Kids Bikes - Battery Operated with Remote Control RIDE ONs
 BB guns
 Bean bag
 Big Wheel
 Bilibo
 Bop It
 Bungee balls
 Clackers
 Contact juggling (acrylic ball)
 Corn Popper
 Cozy Coupe
 Devil Sticks (juggling sticks)
 Footbag (dirt bag / hacky sack)
 Frisbee
 Gee-haw whammy diddle
 Hula Hoop
 Jacks
 Juggling clubs
 Jump rope
 Kite
 Laser tag
 Marbles
 Moon shoes
 Nerf
 Paddle ball
 Pogo stick
 Radio Flyer
 Roller Skates
 Skip It
 Slinky
 Slip 'n Slide
 Soap-box cart
 Space Pets
 Toy gun
 Water gun
 Wiffle bat and ball

Playground

 Ball pit
 Inflatable
 Jungle gym
 Playground slide

Puzzle/assembly
 Jigsaw Puzzle
 Mr. Potato Head
 Perplexus
 Puzzle
 Rubik's Cube
 Tangrams

Science and optical

 Chemistry set
 Etch A Sketch
 Jacob's ladder (toy)
 Kaleidoscope
 Magic 8-Ball
 Sea Monkeys
 Spinning top
 View-Master
 Wooly Willy
 Zoetrope

Sound toys 
Kazoo
Moo box
Noise makers
Squeaky toy
Toy piano
Toy rattle
Whistle
Whirly tube

Spinning toys 

 Beyblade
 Chinese yo-yo (Diabolo)
 Euler's Disk
 Fidget Spinner
 Frisbee (1950s)
 Gyroscope
 Hula hoop (1950s)
 Magnet Space Wheel (Whee-Lo)
 Pinwheel
 Top
 Yo-yo (1930s onwards)

Wooden toys

See also

 Game
 Game manufacturers
 I Love Toys (television program)
 Toy companies
 List of games

Toys
 
Lists of brands